The Haw River Valley American Viticultural Area (AVA) officially became the third federally granted appellation in North Carolina on April 29, 2009, joining the Yadkin Valley AVA and the Swan Creek AVA inside the Yadkin Valley. It encompasses Alamance County and portions of Caswell, Chatham, Guilford, Orange, and Rockingham counties.

References

American Viticultural Areas
2009 establishments in North Carolina
Agriculture in North Carolina